Baidaulagarh is a village in Domariaganj, Uttar Pradesh, India.  It is largely populated by the Agrahari.

References

Villages in Siddharthnagar district